Bergel Rock is a rock nearly  south of Quintana Island in the southwestern Wilhelm Archipelago. It was named by the UK Antarctic Place-Names Committee for Alexandra Bergel, a granddaughter of Sir Ernest Shackleton, and a sponsor for HMS Endurance which made surveys in this area in February 1969.

References 

Rock formations of the Wilhelm Archipelago